Forellen Peak is located in the Teton Range, Grand Teton National Park, in the U.S. state of Wyoming. Unlike the more impressive sections of the Teton Range to the south, Forellen Peak is subdued and the hike to the summit from the north is nontechnical, yet requires many miles of off-trail hiking. Access is best via the Berry Creek trail which can be reached by hiking south from the John D. Rockefeller, Jr. Memorial Parkway or by boat across the northern end of Jackson Lake.

Forelle(n) is a German word meaning "trout(s)".

References

Mountains of Grand Teton National Park
Mountains of Wyoming
Mountains of Teton County, Wyoming